Miss Venezuela 1984 was the 31st Miss Venezuela pageant, was held in Caraballeda, Vargas state, Venezuela, on May 11, 1984, after weeks of events.  The winner of the pageant was Carmen María Montiel, Miss Zulia.

The pageant was broadcast live on Venevision from the Macuto Sheraton Hotel in Caraballeda, Vargas state. At the conclusion of the final night of competition, outgoing titleholder Paola Ruggeri, crowned Carmen María Montiel of Zulia as the new Miss Venezuela.

Results
Miss Venezuela 1984 – Carmen María Montiel (Miss Zulia)

The runners-up were:
1st runner-up – Astrid Carolina Herrera (Miss Miranda)
2nd runner-up – Miriam Leyderman (Miss Nueva Esparta)
3rd runner-up – Carla Mariani (Miss Carabobo)
4th runner-up – Mirla Ochoa (Miss Delta Amacuro)
5th runner-up – Maria Teresa Ambrosino (Miss Barinas)
6th runner-up – Carolina Cristancho (Miss Aragua)
7th runner-up – Ana Rosa Abad (Miss Apure)

Special awards
 Miss Photogenic (voted by press reporters) – Astrid Carolina Herrera (Miss Miranda)
 Miss Congeniality – Consuelo Borges (Miss Amazonas)
 Miss Elegance – Maria Alejandra Castro Egui (Miss Guárico)
 Miss Amity – Maribel Aguilar (Miss Mérida)

Delegates
The Miss Venezuela 1984 delegates are:

 Miss Amazonas – Consuelo Borges Hernández
 Miss Anzoátegui – Rosana Gutierrez Ordonez
 Miss Apure – Ana Rosa Abad Perdomo
 Miss Aragua – Annette Carolina Cristancho Gruber
 Miss Barinas – María Teresa Ambrosino D'Amico
 Miss Bolívar – Petra María -Mery- Muñoz Ojeda
 Miss Carabobo – Carla Mariani Casentini
 Miss Cojedes – Yurby Josefina Bolaños
 Miss Delta Amacuro – Mirla Rociel Ochoa Silva†
 Miss Departamento Vargas – Martha Alida Salas Contreras
 Miss Distrito Federal – Antoinette Medina González
  Miss Falcón – Mary Loly Alba
 Miss Guárico – Maria Alejandra Castro Egui
 Miss Lara – Esther Querales Pérez
 Miss Mérida – Maribel Aguilar Meza
 Miss Miranda  – Astrid Carolina Herrera Irazábal
 Miss Monagas – Maria de los Ángeles Morales Pavía
 Miss Nueva Esparta – Miriam Leyderman Eppel
 Miss Portuguesa – Mercedes Mercedes†
 Miss Sucre – Morelia Chávez González
 Miss Táchira – María Alejandra Niño Berti†
 Miss Yaracuy – Irene Dajdaj Firgau
 Miss Zulia – Carmen María Montiel Avila

External links
Miss Venezuela official website

1984 beauty pageants
1984 in Venezuela